Joseph F. Salgado (born January 10, 1943) is an American lawyer who served as the 7th United States deputy secretary of energy from May 1988 to January 1989.

Early life and education 
Salgado was born in San Diego in 1943. He earned a Bachelor of Science degree from the University of San Francisco in 1968 and a Juris Doctor from the San Francisco Law School in 1972.

Career 
From 1966 to 1973, Salgado served as a sergeant in the Oakland Police Department. From 1973 to 1983, he served in the Office of the Alameda County District Attorney as a deputy district attorney and senior trial attorney. Salgado joined the Reagan administration in 1982, serving as associate commissioner of the Immigration and Naturalization Service for enforcement. From 1983 to 1985, Salgado served as associate director of the White House Presidential Personnel Office. From 1985 to 1988, Salgado served as under secretary of energy, succeeding William Patrick Collins. He served as deputy secretary from 1988 to 1989.

References 

Living people
People from San Diego
California lawyers
1943 births
University of San Francisco alumni
San Francisco Law School alumni
Reagan administration personnel
United States Department of Justice lawyers
United States Department of Justice officials
United States Department of Energy officials
United States Deputy Secretaries of Energy